The Polish Cross Country Championships is an annual cross country running organised by the Polish Athletics Association that serves as the national championship for the sport in Poland. It is usually held in March or April.

It was first held in 1921 for men only and became a regular annual fixture form 1924 onwards. A separate women's championship was created in 1928 and the national championship races for both sexes were held in conjunction from 1946 onwards (with one exception in 1948). The women's race was not held from 1938–45 due to World War II, with the men's race not occurring between 1940–1945 for the same reason.

Zdzisław Krzyszkowiak is the most successful athlete in the men's division, as a six-time champion and twice runner-up. Katarzyna Kowalska is the most successful athlete in the women's division, and overall, having won seven individual titles and finished runner-up on three occasions.

Unlike other large national cross country competitions, the Polish national cross country programme has been highly variable over its history. A men's short race was added to the programme in 1952 and a further intermediate distance followed in 1955, with three men's races over 3 km, 6 km and 12 km. This arrangement largely persisted until 1970, though the long race was dropped from 1960 to 1965. The men's races were reduced to two (a long and an intermediate) in the period from 1971 to 1981. From 1982 to 1988 only a men's long race was held. From 1989 to 1993 long and intermediate distance races were held for men. After a sole long race in 1994 a men's short course was restored to the programme from 1995 to 2001, then only a long race from 2002–2008. Since 2009 a men's long race and short race have been consistently held, typically at distances of 4 km and 10 km.

In its early years, the women's race was held over distances around 1 to 1.5 kilometres. From 1955–57 two women's races were briefly held over distances of 800 metres and 1500 metres. The distance of the women's race increased to 1.8 km in 1968, eventually reached 4 km five years later (matching the distance contested at the 1973 IAAF World Cross Country Championships). Two women's races over 2 km and 4 km were held from 1974–76, then merged into a single 3 km from 1977–78, then returned to a longer two-race format again from 1979–81. A single 4 km women's race was held from 1982 to 1988. From 1989 to 1993 dual races typically around 3 km and 6 km were held. From 1994 to 2008 the single women's race format returned, usually around 4 km in distance. From 2009 to 2014, international standard women's long and short courses were held over 8 km and 4 km. Only a single 5 km race was held from 2015–18, then the international long and short format restored in 2019.

Medalists

Men

Women

Multiple winners

Men's division

Women's division

References

List of winners
National Crosscountry Champions for Poland. Association of Road Racing Statisticians (2017-03-11). Retrieved 2020-07-04.

External links
Polish Athletics Federation website

National cross country running competitions
Athletics competitions in Poland
Annual sporting events in Poland
Recurring sporting events established in 1921
1921 establishments in Poland
Cross country running in Poland